A partial solar eclipse occurred on June 21, 1982. A solar eclipse occurs when the Moon passes between Earth and the Sun, thereby totally or partly obscuring the image of the Sun for a viewer on Earth. A partial solar eclipse occurs in the polar regions of the Earth when the center of the Moon's shadow misses the Earth. Occurring only 7 minutes before perigee, the Moon's apparent diameter was completely larger.

Related eclipses

Eclipses in 1982 
 A total lunar eclipse on January 9.
 A partial solar eclipse on January 25.
 A partial solar eclipse on June 21.
 A total lunar eclipse on July 6.
 A partial solar eclipse on July 20.
 A partial solar eclipse on December 15.
 A total lunar eclipse on December 30.

Solar eclipses of 1982–1985

Metonic series

References

External links 

1982 6 11
1982 in science
1982 6 11
June 1982 events